Mowbullan is a rural locality in the Western Downs Region, Queensland, Australia.

Geography

Mowbullan is completely within and surrounded by the locality of Bunya Mountains. The town of Mount Mowbullan is located on the boundary of Bunya Mountains and Mowbullan.

History 
The locality takes its name from the town of Mount Mowbullan and mountain of the same time. The name comes from the Waka language words mau  meaning head and balan meaning bald, referring to the treeless nature of the mountain.

References 

Western Downs Region
Localities in Queensland